The fifth season of the Mexican sitcom Una familia de diez premiered on October 4, 2020 and concluded on November 15, 2020 on Las Estrellas. Production of the season began on September 18, 2020.

In this season Placido, as always, will find a way to help support the whole family, Martina will have to get used to her new life, and La Nena is about to get an excellent job, which she could lose when the truth of her original family becomes known.

Cast 
 Jorge Ortiz de Pinedo as Plácido López
 Eduardo Manzano as Don Arnoldo López
 Zully Keith as Renata González de López
 Carlos Ignacio as Carlos
 Andrea Torre as La Nena
 Mariana Botas as Martina López
 Moisés Iván Mora as Aldolfo
 María Fernanda García as Licha González
 Camila Rivas as Victoria
 Tadeo Bonavides as Justo "Justito" López
 Daniela Luján as Gaby del Valle de López
 Ricardo Margaleff as Plutarco López

Episodes

References 

2020 Mexican television seasons